The Mangerton River or Mangerton Brook is a 13.37 km (8.31 mi) long river in Dorset, England that is a tributary of the River Asker. The river rises at Powerstock and flows westward through the small village of West Milton (at the centre of the river), then southward through the hamlet Mangerton, before flowing into the River Asker at Bradpole, near Bridport, which itself flows into the River Brit. It also flows through the West Dorset Alder Woods protected area.

Mangerton River powers the Grade II-listed Mangerton Mill.

Water quality 
Water quality of the Mangerton River in 2019, according to the Environment Agency:

References

External links 
Mangerton River at RiverLevels.uk
Mangerton River at Wikishire

Rivers of Dorset